Streptomyces pulveraceus is a bacterium species from the genus of Streptomyces which has been isolated from soil in Fukuchiyama in Japan. Streptomyces pulveraceus produces zygomycine and fostriecin.

Further reading

See also 
 List of Streptomyces species

References

External links
Type strain of Streptomyces pulveraceus at BacDive -  the Bacterial Diversity Metadatabase	

pulveraceus
Bacteria described in 1961